{{family name hatnote|Al-Alawi (Arabic patronymic surname), and her middle name is Marbella (Philippine matronymic surname)}}
Mariam Sayed Sameer Marbella Al-Alawi (born 25 December 1996), known professionally as Ivana Alawi, is a Filipino actress, model, and YouTuber. She is also the CEO of her own skincare brand called Ivana Skin.

Regarded as one of the biggest social media influencers of her time, Alawi is the most subscribed Filipino celebrity on YouTube, having been honored by Google as the "Top YouTube Content Creator" in the Philippines for two consecutive years. In 2019, she won "Best New Female TV Personality" at the PMPC Star Awards for Television. In 2021, Alawi was ranked fourth on the "100 Most Beautiful Faces in the World" list by TC Candler.

Career

 Television 
Alawi appeared on the sixth season of GMA-7's StarStruck, which aired in 2015, where she placed among the top 22 contestants. She was later signed by GMA Artist Center.

In 2018, Alawi appeared as Rina in ABS-CBN's Precious Hearts Romances Presents: Araw Gabi. A year later she appeared as Amor in Ang Probinsyano, made her film debut in the film Open and was later cast in the Metro Manila Film Festival entry 3pol Trobol: Huli Ka Balbon!, and appeared as Lolita in Sino ang Maysala?: Mea Culpa'',for which she was awarded Best New Female Personality in the 33rd PMPC Star Awards for Television.

YouTube 

Alawi launched a self-titled YouTube channel in 2019. Her channel currently is one of the most subscribed in YouTube Philippines.

Personal life
Alawi was raised in Bahrain to a Filipino mother and a Moroccan father. The third of four children, she eventually inherited all of her father's money after his death in 2018. Her youngest sibling is former child actress Mona Alawi.

Following her parents' separation, the 7-year-old Alawi flew alone to the Philippines to live with her mother. The former worked various side jobs to financially support them in the Philippines.

Filmography

Film

Television

Music videos

Awards and nominations

References

External links

1996 births
Living people
Participants in Philippine reality television series
StarStruck (Philippine TV series) participants
GMA Network personalities
ABS-CBN personalities
Filipino female models
Filipino film actresses
Filipino people of Moroccan descent
Filipino television actresses
Filipino television personalities
Filipino YouTubers
People from Manila
Star Magic personalities
Tagalog people
21st-century Filipino actresses